The Northern Command (Pikud Tzafon, often abbreviated to Patzan)  is a regional command in the Israel Defense Forces. The command, whose main headquarters is in Safed, is responsible for all the units located between Hermon and Netanya. The mission of the Northern Command is to protect Israel's northern borders with Syria and Lebanon

History
During the wars in the 1960s and 70s, the Northern Command was in charge of the campaigns directed against Syria on the Golan Heights and the Lebanese border. During the 1970s and 80s, it mainly faced attacks from the PLO, which was driven to southern Lebanon following Black September. Beginning with the 1982 Lebanon War, the Northern Command faced attacks from Hezbollah, a Lebanese militant group founded in 1982 to fight the Israeli occupation of Southern Lebanon. During 2000, the Northern Command completed its withdrawal from the Security Zone in southern Lebanon and was dispatched along the UN-sanctioned border. Although Israel's withdrawal from southern Lebanon has been met with UN approval, Hezbollah continues its attacks, mainly in the Shebaa farms area of Mount Hermon, an area occupied by Israel from Syria and which Hezbollah claims as Lebanese territory.

Units

The Northern Command commands regional units from Mount Hermon in the Golan Heights, to Netanya, with a significant presence in the Galilee and the Golan Heights.

 Northern Command in Safed
 36th "Ga'ash/Rage" Armor Division
 91st "Galil" (Territorial) Division (doubles as reserve infantry division)
 210th "Bashan" (Territorial) Division (doubles as reserve infantry division)
 319th "Ha-Mapatz" (Reserve) Armor Division
 5001st "Northern Golan" Logistic Support Unit
 5002nd "Lebanon" Logistic Support Unit
 5003rd "Southern Golan" Logistic Support Unit
 Northern Command Signal Battalion
 Northern Command Engineering Unit
 Northern Command Intelligence Unit
 Northern Command Military Police Unit
 Northern Command Medical Unit
 651st Maintenance Center

Commanders
Moshe Carmel (1948–1949)
Yosef Avidar (1949–1952)
Moshe Dayan (1952)
Asaf Simhoni (1952–1954)
Moshe Tzadok (1954–1956)
Yitzhak Rabin (1956–1959)
Meir Zorea (1959–1962)
Avraham Yoffe (1962–1964)
David Elazar (1964–1969)
Mordechai Gur (1969–1972, 1974)
Yitzhak Hofi (1972–1974)
Rafael Eitan (1974–1977)
Avigdor Ben Gal (1977–1981)
Amir Drori (1981–1983)
Ori Orr (1983–1986)
Yossi Peled (1986–1991)
Yitzhak Mordechai (1991–1994)
Amiram Levin (1994–1998)
Gabi Ashkenazi (1998–2002)
Benny Gantz (2002–2005)
Udi Adam (2005–2006)
Gadi Eizenkot (2006–2011)
Yair Golan (2011–2014)
Aviv Kochavi (2014–2017)
Yoel Strick (2017–2019)
Amir Baram (2019–2022)
Ori Gordin (2022–present)

Notes

 
Regional commands of Israel